Alexandru Ionescu may refer to:

Alexandru Ionescu (bobsledder) (1903-?), Romanian bobsledder
Alexandru Ionescu (socialist militant) (1862-1929), Romanian socialist militant